Morrison Brook is a river in Delaware County, New York. It flows into the East Branch Delaware River north of East Branch.

References

Rivers of New York (state)
Rivers of Delaware County, New York